The 1976 Ohio State Buckeyes football team represented the Ohio State University in the 1976 Big Ten Conference football season. The Buckeyes compiled a 9–2–1 record, including the 1977 Orange Bowl in Miami, where they won, 27–10, against the Colorado.

Schedule

Depth chart

Coaching staff
 Woody Hayes – Head Coach (26th year)
 George Chaump – Offense (9th year)
 George Hill (American football) – Defensive Coordinator (6th year)
 Alex Gibbs – Offensive Coordinator/ Offensive Line (2nd year)
 Mickey Jackson –  (3rd year)
 John Mummey – Quarterbacks (8th year)
 Ralph Staub –  (7th year)
 Dick Walker – Defensive Backs (8th year)

Season summary

Michigan State

at Penn State

Missouri

The loss snapped 25-game home win streak

UCLA

at Iowa

at Wisconsin

Purdue

at Indiana

Illinois

at Minnesota

    
    
    

Ohio State clinches at least a share of Big Ten title for record fifth straight year.

Michigan

Orange Bowl (vs Colorado)

1977 NFL draftees

References

Ohio State
Ohio State Buckeyes football seasons
Big Ten Conference football champion seasons
Orange Bowl champion seasons
Ohio State Buckeyes football